Matt Braun is an author specializing in novels of the American West. He has written fifty-six books, most of which are in the Western genre and has over 40 million copies in print.

Biography
Born in Oklahoma, Braun was raised in a rancher family among the Cherokee and Osage tribes. The state has been the setting of several novels, including Outlaw Kingdom, The Kincaids, and One Last Town.

Books

Westerns

Black Fox
Black Gold
Bloodsport
Bloodstorm
Bloody Hand
The Brannocks 
Buck Colter
Cimarron Jordan
Crossfire
Dakota
Deadwood 
Deathwalk
A Distant Land
Doc Holliday
Dodge City
El Paso
The Gamblers
Gentleman Rogue 
Hangman's Creek
Hickok & Cody
The Highbinders
Indian Territory
The Judas Tree
Jury Of Six
The Killing Touch 
The Kincaids
Kinch
The Last Stand 
Lords Of The Land
The Manhunter
Noble Outlaw
One Last Town (also published as You Know My Name)
Outlaw Kingdom
The Overlords
Rio Grande
Rio Hondo
The Road To Hell 
Savage Land
Shadow Killers
The Second Coming Of Lucas Brokaw
The Spoilers
Tenbow
Texas Empire
A Time Of Innocence 
Tombstone
Wages Of Sin 
The Warlords
Westward Of The Law 
The Wild Ones
Windward West
Wyatt Earp
WesternLore

Non-fiction
How To Write Novels That Sell
Matt Braun's Western Cooking
How To Write Western Novels

In other media

The 1973 novel Black Fox, was made into the CBS miniseries of the same name in 1995. It starred Tony Todd as Britt Johnson/Black Fox, Christopher Reeve as Alan Johnson, and Nancy Sorel as Sarah Johnson. The adaptation was written by John Binder, and directed by Steven Hilliard Stern.

The 1997 novel One Last Town served as inspiration for the TNT miniseries You Know My Name'' in 1999. It starred Sam Elliott  as Bill Tilghman, and Arliss Howard as Wiley Lynn. Braun is credited as "Historical consultant" on the series.

Awards
Braun is the winner of the Owen Wister Award for lifetime achievement, the Western Writers of America Golden Spur Award, and the Festival of the West Cowboy Spirit Award.  He has also been awarded the honorary title of Oklahoma Territorial Marshal by the Governor of Oklahoma.

References

External links
Matt Braun Official Web Site

20th-century American novelists
20th-century American male writers
21st-century American novelists
American Western (genre) novelists
Novelists from Oklahoma
1932 births
Living people
American male novelists
21st-century American male writers